The 69th Scripps National Spelling Bee was held at Grand Hyatt Washington in Washington, D.C. on May 29–30, 1996, sponsored by the E.W. Scripps Company.

Twelve-year-old Wendy Guey, from West Palm Beach, Florida won the competition by correctly spelling the word "vivisepulture". This was Guey's fourth bee, her previous best was fourth-place in the 1993 bee. Second place went to 13-year old Nikki Dowdy of Houston, Texas, who missed "cervicorn".

There were 247 participants this year, 51% female, with about one-fourth coming from a private or parochial school, and 12 home-schoolers.

References

Scripps National Spelling Bee competitions
1996 in Washington, D.C.
1996 in education
May 1996 events in the United States